Hegel-Jahrbuch or Hegel Yearbook or Hegel Annual is an annual peer-reviewed academic journal covering the thought of Georg Wilhelm Friedrich Hegel published by International Hegel Society. It was established in 1961 and publishes contributions in English and German. The editors are Andreas Arndt, Brady Bowman, Myriam Gerhard and Jure Zovko. All issues are available online from the Philosophy Documentation Center.

See also 
Kant Yearbook
 Kant-Studien
 List of philosophy journals

References

External links 
 

Annual journals
Multilingual journals
Publications established in 1961
Works about Georg Wilhelm Friedrich Hegel
Hegel
1961 establishments in Germany
Academic journals published in Germany